Banal nationalism refers to the everyday representations of the nation which build a shared sense of national belonging amongst humans, a sense of tribalism through
national identity.
The term is derived from English academic, Michael Billig's 1995 book of the same name and is intended to be understood critically. Billig's book has been described as 'the fourth most cited work on nationalism ever published'. Billig devised the concept of 'banal nationalism' to highlight the routine and often unnoticed ways that established nation-states are reproduced from day to day. The concept has been highly influential, particularly within the discipline of political geography, with continued academic interest since the book's publication in 1995. Today the term is used primarily in academic discussion of identity formation, geopolitics, and the nature of nationalism in contemporary political culture.

Examples of banal nationalism include the use of flags in everyday contexts, sporting events, national songs, symbols on money, popular expressions and turns of phrase, patriotic clubs,  the use of implied togetherness in the national press, for example, the use of terms such as  prime minister,  weather,  team, and divisions into "domestic" and "international" news. Many of these symbols are most effective because of their constant repetition, and almost subliminal nature. Banal nationalism is often created via state institutions such as schools.
It can contribute to bottom-up processes of nation-building.

Michael Billig's primary purpose in coining the term was to clearly differentiate everyday, endemic nationalism from extremist variants. He argued that the academic and journalistic focus on extreme nationalists, independence movements, and xenophobes in the 1980s and 1990s obscured the strength of contemporary nationalism, by implying that nationalism was a fringe ideology rather than a dominant theme in contemporary political culture. Billig noted the almost unspoken assumption of the utmost importance of the nation in political discourse of the time, for example in the calls to protect Kuwait during the 1991 Gulf War, or to take action in USA after 9/11. He argues that the "hidden" nature of modern nationalism makes it a very powerful ideology, partially because it remains largely unexamined and unchallenged, yet remains the basis for powerful political movements, and most political violence in the world today. Banal nationalism should not be thought of as a weak form of nationalism, but the basis for "dangerous nationalisms". However, in earlier times, calls to the "nation" were not as important, when religion, monarchy or family might have been invoked more successfully to mobilize action. He also uses the concept to dispute post-modernist claims that the nation-state is in decline, noting particularly the continued hegemonic power of American nationalism.

Further reading

References

Nationalism